The 2006 United Indoor Football season was preceded by 2005 and succeeded by 2007. It was the second season of the UIF.  The league champions were the Sioux Falls Storm, who defended their title by defeating the Lexington Horsemen in United Bowl II and acquired a perfect season.

The only changes in the league in 2006 were that the Tennessee Valley Raptors moved from Huntington, Alabama to Rockford, Illinois, where they became the Rock River Raptors, and Bloomington was added as an expansion team.

Standings

 Green indicates clinched playoff berth
 Purple indicates division champion
 Grey indicates best league record

Playoffs

External links
 2006 UIF season stats

United Indoor Football seasons
2006 in American football